George Washington Hoss (November 6, 1824 – April 11, 1906) was an American educator serving many positions at several institutions. Hoss was most notable for being an Indiana Superintendent of Public Instruction and the Kansas State Normal School's (KSN) second president.

Biography

Early life and education
Hoss' parents, Jacob and Jane Kinney Hoss, moved his family to Indiana in 1836, twelve years after Hoss was born in 1824. Hoss attended Indiana Asbury University, where he graduated in 1850 and 1853.

Principal, professor, state educator
After graduating college, Hoss became the principal at Muncie Academy, located in Muncie, Indiana, from 1850 to 1852. After leaving Muncie Academy, he then went to serve as a professor of mathematics at the Indiana Females College in Indianapolis, Indiana from 1852 to 1856 before leaving to become a professor at Butler University from 1856 to 1864. In 1864, Hoss became the eighth superintendent of the Indiana Department of Education. He resigned in 1968.

Kansas State Normal president
On July 1, 1871, Hoss replaced Lyman Beecher Kellogg, to become the Kansas State Normal School's second president. While president, Hoss was able to secure funds needed from the Kansas Legislature to build another building, and the school's enrollment increased to 200. In 1872, Hoss hosted state representatives at KSN, which concluded with the House securing $50,000 for the school with city of Emporia providing $10,000, the day after their visit.

In April 1873, Hoss reported issues with the professors to the Kansas Board of Regents and advised that everyone employed should submit their resignations and for the Board to decide who was to be rehired; the Board decided in May 1873, to rehire Hoss, along with only one other faculty member. In August 1873, Hoss announced his resignation as president to become a professor at Indiana University. He continued until December 31 of that year.

After the normal school presidency
After Hoss resigned from the Normal School in 1873, him and his family returned to Indiana where he became a professor at Indiana University. Seven years later in 1880, Hoss returned to Topeka, Kansas, purchasing The Educationist. In 1884, Hoss became a professor and chair of the English Department at Baker University.

In 1880 after being in Baldwin for six years, Hoss and his second wife, May Engstrom, moved to Wichita, Kansas and founded the Western School of Elocution and Oratory. The Hoss family remained there until his death in 1906.

Personal life
After graduating from Indiana Asbury, Hoss was married to his first wife, Harriet Mitchell, in 1850 and had a son together named Melville Mitchell in 1853. Hoss and Harriet were married until 1886 when she died due to an illness. In 1888, Hoss and May Engstrom united in marriage, in which they had one son named Wendell born in 1892.

On April 11, 1906, Hoss died in Wichita.

References

Presidents of Emporia State University
Emporia State University faculty
Indiana University faculty
Baker University faculty
DePauw University alumni
People from Brown County, Ohio
Superintendents of Public Instruction of Indiana
1824 births
1906 deaths